Alangudi may refer to:
Alangudi, Nagapattinam, a village in Nagapattinam district, Tamil Nadu, India
Alangudi, Papanasam taluk, a village in Thanjavur district, Tamil Nadu, India
Alangudi, Pudukkottai, a town in Pudukkottai district, Tamil Nadu, India
Alangudi (state assembly constituency), a constituency in Tamil Nadu, India
Alangudi taluk, a taluk in Pudukkottai district, Tamil Nadu, India